Eva Yi-Hwa Chen is a Taiwanese businessperson and the co-founder and CEO of Trend Micro, one of the world's largest software security firms. In 2010, CRN Magazine named her as one of the "Top 100 Most Influential Executives in the Industry". She was fifth on the 2012 Forbes  list of "Asia's 50 Power Businesswomen".

Early life
Chen was born in Taichung, Taiwan. One of her earlier memories was when her house caught fire from some downed telephone wires. She struggled with a fear of telephones for years after the incident.

Chen attended National Chengchi University in Taipei where she earned a degree in philosophy. After graduation she worked briefly in the publishing industry. In 1984 she moved to United States where she received a master's degree in management information systems from the University of Texas at Dallas. Back in Taiwan, she worked briefly for Acer Inc. in their research department before leaving to write for a Chinese newspaper.

Career
In 1988, she co-founded Trend Micro with her brother-in-law Steve Chang and her sister Jenny. Chen was executive vice president of the company until 1996 when she became chief technology officer. During her tenure as CTO she devised the Network VirusWall. In 2005, she assumed the position of CEO at Trend Micro. Under her leadership, Trend Micro has shifted its focus from traditional antivirus to cloud protection, purchasing Canadian security company Third Brigade in 2009 and cloud storage service humyo in 2010. In 2012, she received a Cloud Security Alliance Industry Leadership Award for her contributions to cloud security in the Asia-Pacific region.

Personal life
Chen is married to Daniel Chiang, co-founder of Sina.com. In 2006, the Securities and Exchange Commission investigated her for possibly underreporting her Trend Micro holdings.

She resides primarily in Pasadena, California, US with her son Peter and daughter Melody.

References

Living people
American women chief executives
Taiwanese chief executives
Businesspeople from Taichung
Taiwanese company founders
Taiwanese women company founders
Taiwanese expatriates in the United States
National Chengchi University alumni
University of Texas at Dallas alumni
1959 births
20th-century Taiwanese businesspeople
21st-century Taiwanese businesspeople
21st-century American women